XHNOE-FM (branded as Stereo 91 FM) is a Spanish-language Talk format FM radio station that serves the  Laredo, Texas, United States and Nuevo Laredo, Tamaulipas, Mexico border area.

History
XHNOE was the first FM radio station in the two Laredos, signing on in February 1967. Its original concessionaire was Fidel Cuéllar González and it broadcast with just 890 watts on 93.7 MHz. Upon Fidel's death, Josefina González Vda. de Cuéllar became the concessionaire in 1979. By this time, XHNOE was on 91.3 and had increased its power. A corporation was created to hold the station in 1996.

Longtime station personality Roberto Gálvez Martínez died of COVID-19 on August 1, 2020; he had worked at XHNOE from 1974 until his death.

External links
XHNOE Official Web Site

References

Radio stations in Nuevo Laredo
Radio stations in Laredo, Texas